"Hurtful" is a song by Swedish singer-songwriter Erik Hassle from his first studio album, Hassle (2009). The song was released on 10 th December, 2008 through Roxy Recordings as the lead single.  "Hurtful" peaked at number 11 in Sweden   and peaked at number 2 in Denmark. The song was added to his international debut album Pieces in 2010.

Critical reception
Rosie Swash from The Guardian calls Hassle the male version of Robyn. "We might even go as far to say he sounds like Basshunter and Mika. In the review, she added that "you'll be silently weeping at this homage to lost love."

Formats and track listings
(Released 12 January 2010)
 "Hurtful" - 3:03

(Released November 2009)
 "Hurtful" - 3:03
 "Hurtful (Erik Hassle v.s. Penguin Prison)" - 4:35

(Released 10 December 2008)
 "Hurtful" - 3:03
 "The Thanks I Get" - 4:38

(Released 12 January 2010)
 "Hurtful" - 3:03

(Released 7 February 2010)
 "Hurtful"
 "Hurtful (DC Breaks VIP Remix)" 

(Released 7 February 2010)
 "Hurtful (Jerome Isma-Ae Remix)" - 7:25
 "Hurtful (Roqwell & I Sancho Remix)" - 6:41
 "Hurtful (Zombie Disco Squad Remix)" - 7:16
 "Hurtful (DC Breaks VIP Remix)" - 3:24

Charts

Certifications

References

2008 debut singles
Erik Hassle songs
2010 singles
2008 songs
Songs written by Erik Hassle
Songs written by Tommy Tysper